Maria Koleva (born August 10, 1977 in Sofia) is a Bulgarian rhythmic gymnast.

At the 1996 Olympic Games, held in Atlanta, she won a silver medal as part of the Bulgarian rhythmic gymnastics group (along with teammates Ina Delcheva, Valentina Kevlian, Maya Tabakova, Ivelina Taleva and Viara Vatashka).

See also 
 Gymnastics at the 1996 Summer Olympics – Women's rhythmic group all-around

References

External links 
 Maria Koleva at FIG
 
 

1977 births
Living people
Bulgarian rhythmic gymnasts
Gymnasts at the 1996 Summer Olympics
Olympic gymnasts of Bulgaria
Gymnasts from Sofia